A wedgie is the act of forcibly pulling a person's underpants upwards from the back. The act is often performed as a school prank or a form of bullying.

Wedgies are commonly featured in popular works, either as a form of low comedy or as a behaviour representative of bullying. In such works, briefs are usually the type of underpants that are worn by the victim.

Dangers
Wedgies, especially when performed on males, can be dangerous, potentially causing testicular or scrotal damage. An incident in 2004 involving a ten-year-old boy required reattachment of a testicle to the scrotum.

Variations

As a prank or form of bullying, there are a number of variants to the normal, or traditional wedgie. It is impractical to list every variant, as the names and processes can be rather subjective; however, there are a few better-known variants of the wedgie.
 The melvin is a variant where the victim's underwear is pulled up from the front, to cause injury, or, at least, severe pain to the victim's genitals.
 The atomic wedgie entails hoisting the waistband of the receiver's underpants up and over their head.
 The hanging wedgie is a variant in which the victim is hung from his or her underwear, elevated above the ground.
 The ripping wedgie involves the tearing of the victim’s underpants, sometimes ripping off a portion (such as the waistband) of them, or forcibly removing the garment entirely.

See also 
 List of practical joke topics
 Indian burn

References

External links 

 

Bullying
Undergarments
Practical jokes